The Banana Wars were a series of conflicts that consisted of military occupation, police action, and intervention by the United States in Central America and the Caribbean between the end of the Spanish–American War in 1898 and the inception of the Good Neighbor Policy in 1934. The military interventions were primarily carried out by the United States Marine Corps, who also developed a manual, the Small Wars Manual (1921) based on their experiences. On occasion, the United States Navy provided gunfire support and troops from the United States Army were also deployed.

With the Treaty of Paris signed in 1898, control of Cuba, Puerto Rico, Guam, and the Philippines fell to the United States (surrendered from Spain). Following this, the United States proceeded to conduct military interventions in Cuba, Panama, Honduras, Nicaragua, Mexico, Haiti, and the Dominican Republic. These conflicts ended with the withdrawal of troops from Haiti in 1934 under President Franklin D. Roosevelt.

The term "banana wars" was popularized in 1983 by writer Lester D. Langley. Langley wrote several books on Latin American history and American intervention, including: The United States and the Caribbean, 1900–1970 and The Banana Wars: An Inner History of American Empire, 1900–1934. His work regarding the Banana Wars encompasses the entire United States tropical empire, which overtook the western hemisphere, spanning both Roosevelt presidencies. The term was popularized through this writing and portrayed the United States as a police force sent to reconcile these warring tropical countries, lawless societies and corrupt politicians; essentially establishing US reign over tropical trade. Hundreds of American soldiers and thousands of locals died in the Banana Wars.

Origins

Most prominently, the US was advancing economic, political, and military interests in order to maintain its sphere of influence and to secure the Panama Canal (which opened in 1914). The United States had recently built the Panama Canal in order to promote global trade and to project its naval power. US companies, such as the United Fruit Company, also had financial stakes in the production of bananas, tobacco, sugar cane, and other commodities throughout the Caribbean, Central America and northern South America.

Combat history

Interventions

Panama: U.S. interventions in the isthmus go back to the 1846 Mallarino–Bidlack Treaty and intensified after the so-called Watermelon Riot of 1856. In 1885 US military intervention gained a mandate with the construction of the Panama Canal. The building process collapsed in bankruptcy, mismanagement, and disease in 1889, but resumed in the 20th century. In 1903, Panama seceded from the Republic of Colombia, backed by the U.S. government, during the Thousand Days' War. The Hay–Pauncefote Treaty allowed the US to construct and control the Panama Canal. In 1903 the United States established sovereignty over a Panama Canal Zone.
Spanish–American War: U.S. forces seized Cuba and Puerto Rico from Spain in 1898. The end of the Spanish–American War led to the start of the Banana Wars.
Cuba: In December 1899, U.S. president William McKinley declared Leonard Wood, a United States Army general, to have supreme power in Cuba. The U.S. conquered Cuba from the Spanish Empire. It was occupied by the U.S. from 1898 to 1902 under Wood as its military governor, and again from 1906 to 1909, 1912, and 1917 to 1922, subject to the terms of the Cuban–American Treaty of Relations (1903) until 1934. In 1903 the US took a permanent lease on the Guantanamo Bay Naval Base.
Dominican Republic: Action in 1903, 1904 (the Santo Domingo Affair), and 1914 (Naval forces engaged in battles in the city of Santo Domingo); occupied by the U.S. from 1916 to 1924. When a rebellion in the Dominican Republic, for example, damaged an American-owned sugar cane plantation, American troops were sent in, starting in 1916. They took over a small castle called Fort Ozama, killed the men inside and set up a military presence to protect their business interests. Dominican forces, who had no machine guns or modern artillery, tried to take on the U.S. Marines in conventional battles, but were defeated at the Battle of Las Trencheras (the trenches), Battle of Guayacanas and the Battle of San Francisco de Macoris. Despite having much greater firepower, it took the U.S. Marines five years to suppress an insurgency in the eastern provinces of El Seibo and San Pedro de Macorís. During the occupation, 144 U.S. Marines were killed in action and 50 were wounded. The Dominicans suffered 950 casualties.
Nicaragua: Occupied by the U.S. almost continuously from 1912 to 1933, after intermittent landings and naval bombardments in the prior decades. The U.S. had troops in Nicaragua to prevent its leaders from creating conflicts with U.S. interests in the country. The bluejackets and marines were there for about 15 years. The U.S. claimed it wanted Nicaragua to elect "good men", who ostensibly would not threaten to disrupt U.S. interests.
Mexico: U.S. military involvements with Mexico in this period had the same general commercial and political causes, but stand as a special case. The Americans conducted the Border War with Mexico from 1910–1919 for additional reasons: to control the flow of immigrants and refugees from revolutionary Mexico (pacificos), and to counter rebel raids into U.S. territory. The 1914 U.S. occupation of Veracruz, however, was an exercise of armed influence; not an issue of border integrity; it was aimed at cutting off the supplies of German munitions to the government of Mexican leader Victoriano Huerta, which U.S. President Woodrow Wilson refused to recognize. In the years prior to World War I, the U.S. was also alert to the regional balance of power against Germany. The Germans were actively arming and advising the Mexicans, as shown by the 1914  arms-shipping incident, German saboteur Lothar Witzke's base in Mexico City, the 1917 Zimmermann Telegram and the German advisors present during the 1918 Battle of Ambos Nogales. Only twice during the Mexican Revolution did the U.S. military occupy Mexico: during the temporary occupation of Veracruz in 1914 and between 1916 and 1917, when U.S. General John Pershing led U.S. Army forces on a nationwide search for Pancho Villa.
Haiti, occupied by the U.S. from 1915–1934, which led to the creation of a new Haitian constitution in 1917 that instituted changes that included an end to the prior ban on land ownership by non-Haitians. This period included the First and Second Caco Wars.
Honduras, where the United Fruit Company and Standard Fruit Company dominated the country's key banana export sector and associated land holdings and railways, saw insertion of American troops in 1903, 1907, 1911, 1912, 1919, 1924 and 1925. The writer O. Henry coined the term "banana republic" in 1904 to describe Honduras.

Other Latin American nations were influenced or dominated by American economic policies and/or commercial interests to the point of coercion. Theodore Roosevelt declared the Roosevelt Corollary to the Monroe Doctrine in 1904, asserting the right of the United States to intervene to stabilize the economic affairs of states in the Caribbean and Central America if they were unable to pay their international debts. From 1909–1913, President William Howard Taft and his Secretary of State Philander C. Knox asserted a more "peaceful and economic" Dollar Diplomacy foreign policy, although that too was backed by force, as in Nicaragua.

American fruit companies

The first decades of the history of Honduras is marked by instability in terms of politics and economy. Indeed, three armed conflicts occurred between independence and the rise to power of the Carias government. This instability was due in part to the American involvement in the country.

The first company that concluded an agreement with the Honduras government was the Vaccaro Brothers Company (Standard Fruit Company). The Cuyamel Fruit Company then followed their lead. United Fruit Company also  contracted with the government through its subsidiaries, Tela Railroad Company and Truxillo Rail Road Company.

Contract between the Honduran government and the American companies most often involved exclusive rights to a piece of land in exchange for building railroads in Honduras. 

However, banana producers in Central America (including Honduras) "were scourged by Panama disease, a soil-borne fungus (…) that decimated production over large regions". Typically, companies would abandon the decimated plantations and destroy the railroads and other utilities that they had used along with the plantation, so the exchange of services between the government and the companies was not always respected.

The ultimate goal of the contracts for the companies was control of the banana trade from production to distribution. The companies would finance guerrilla fighters, presidential campaigns and governments. According to Rivera and Carranza, the indirect participation of American companies in the country's armed conflicts worsened the situation. The presence of more dangerous and modern weapons allowed more dangerous warfare among the factions.

In British Honduras (now Belize) the situation was significantly different. Although the United Fruit Company was the sole exporter of bananas there, and the company also attempted to manipulate the local government, the country did not suffer the instability and armed conflicts that its neighbors experienced.

Smedley Butler

Perhaps the single most active military officer in the Banana Wars was U.S. Marine Corps Major General, Smedley Butler, nicknamed "Maverick Marine", who saw action in Honduras in 1903, served in Nicaragua enforcing American policy from 1909 to 1912, was awarded the Medal of Honor for his role in Veracruz in 1914, and a second Medal of Honor for bravery in Haiti in 1915. After his forced retirement for making reckless statements, Butler made a career of speaking to left-wing groups denouncing capitalism. His standard speech after 1933 was titled War is a Racket, where he denounced the role he had played, describing himself as "a high class muscle man for Big Business, for Wall Street and the bankers...a racketeer, a gangster for capitalism".

See also
Foreign interventions by the United States
United States involvement in regime change in Latin America
United States involvement in regime change
United States color-coded war plans
First Honduran civil war 
Second Honduran civil war

Notes

References

Further reading
 Anthony, Constance G. "American democratic interventionism: Romancing the iconic Woodrow Wilson." International Studies Perspectives 9.3 (2008): 239-253 abstract.
 Weeks, Gregory B. U.S. and Latin American relations (John Wiley & Sons, 2015).

External links 
 

 
Invasions by the United States
Trade wars
United States Marine Corps in the 18th and 19th centuries
United States Marine Corps in the 20th century
United States–South American relations
Wars involving the United States
Wars involving the Dominican Republic